Martin Josef Munzinger (11 November 1791 – 6 February 1855) was a Swiss politician.

He was elected to the Swiss Federal Council on 16 November 1848, as one of the first seven Councilors. While in office he held the following departments:
 Department of Finance (1848–1850)
 Political Department (1851)
 Department of Finance (1852)
 Department of Posts and Construction (1853–1854)
 Department of Trade and Customs (1855)
and was President of the Confederation in 1851.

Munzinger died in office on 6 February 1855.

References 

 Hans Haeflinger: Bundesrat Josef Munzinger, 1953

External links 
 
 
 Hans-Rudolf Merz: Bundesrat Munzinger: Der Vater des Schweizerfrankens, 2005  
 

1791 births
1855 deaths
People from Olten
Swiss Roman Catholics
Free Democratic Party of Switzerland politicians
Foreign ministers of Switzerland
Finance ministers of Switzerland
Members of the Federal Council (Switzerland)
Members of the Council of States (Switzerland)
Members of the National Council (Switzerland)